Molino or El Molino can refer to:

Places
 Molino, several barangay (districts) within the city of Bacoor, Cavite, Philippines
 Molino, Florida, a census-designated place in Escambia County
 El Molino, La Guajira, a town and municipality in the Colombian Department of La Guajira
 Molino (Messina), a frazione of the comune of Messina, Province of Messina, Sicily
 Molino, Missouri, an unincorporated place 
 Molino, Pennsylvania, a village in West Brunswick Township, Schuylkill County, Pennsylvania
 Molino Canyon, a gorge in Arizona
 Molino de Flores Nezahualcóyotl National Park, Texcoco, Mexico
 Molino dei Torti, a comune in the Province of Alessandria in the Italian region of Piedmont
 Molino del Rey, a former royal windmill near Mexico City, now the site of Los Pinos, official residence of the President of Mexico
 Battle of Molino del Rey, fought 1847 during the Mexican–American War
 Molino District, one of four districts of the province Pachitea in Peru
 Molino Nuovo, a quarter of the city of Lugano, in the Swiss canton of Ticino
People
 Andrea Molino (born 1964), Italian composer and conductor
 Anthony Molino (born 1957), American translator, anthropologist, and psychoanalyst
 Antonio Molino Rojo (1926-2011), Spanish film actor
 Fernando García del Molino (1813–99), Chilean-born Argentine portrait painter, miniaturist and lithographer
 Francesco Molino (1775-1847), Italian guitarist and composer
 Jean Molino (active from 1990), French semiologist at the University of Lausanne
 Jorge Molino (Jorge Molino Baena, born 1988), Spanish footballer
 Kevin Molino (born 1990), Trinidadian footballer
 Lou Molino III (active from 1985), American drummer
 Walter Molino (1915–97), Italian comics artist and illustrator

Other
 Molino Dam, a gravity dam on the Zapote River, Philippines
 Molino de Pérez, a windmill in Montevideo, Uruguay
 El Molino High School, Forestville, California
 El Molino River, two streams in El Salvador
 El Molino Viejo (AKA The Old Mill), a former grist mill in San Marino, California
 cabaret venue in Barcelona, Spain

See also 
 Archaeological Area of Poggio del Molino, Tuscany, Italy
 Confitería El Molino, an Art Nouveau style coffeehouse in Buenos Aires, Argentina
 Nudorthodes molino, a moth in the family Noctuidae
 Paso del Molino, a barrio (neighbourhood or district) in Montevideo, Uruguay
 Ponte Molino (Padua), a Roman segmental arch bridge across the Bacchiglione in Padua, Italy
 Rancho El Molino, a Mexican land grant in present-day Sonoma County, California
 University of Perpetual Help System DALTA – Molino Campus, Bacoor, Cavite, Philippines
 Los Molinos (disambiguation)
 Molinos (disambiguation)